Visakha Vidyalaya is a girls' school in Colombo, Sri Lanka. It is a National School managed by the central government providing primary and secondary education.

History

The school was established in 1917 by Celestina Dias as the Buddhist Girls College in a house called 'The Firs' in Turret Road, Colombo, Sri Lanka. It was the desire of Dias to train the school girls according to the Buddhist moral values and principles. In 1927 it moved to its present premises in Vajira Road, Colombo and was named Visakha Vidyalaya by Lady Herbert Stanley the wife of the Governor of Ceylon at that time. In 1939 the school was affiliated with Lady Irwin College, New Delhi to conduct courses in Home economics. Science subjects were introduced to the curriculum in 1946, for the first time in a girls' school in Sri Lanka.

School motto
The school's motto is from the Alavaka Sutta in the Sutta Pitaka of the Tripitaka. When the yakkha Alavaka first confronted Buddha, he threatened to exterminate Buddha unless he, Buddha were to answer all his questions. One of the questions asked was "Kathansu Parisujjhati" (how is one cleansed) to which Buddha replied, "Paññaya Parisujjhati" (by wisdom is one cleansed).

Houses
All the current house names are derived from the names of past principals of the school. There are six houses at Visakha:

Past principals

Notable alumni

 Kusala Abhayavardhana, social worker and member of parliament - Borella (1970-77)
 Senali Fonseka, actress 
 Kshanika Hirimburegama, Vice-Chancellor of the University of Colombo
 Oshadie Kuruppu, Sri Lankan badminton player
 Kamini Nirmala Mendis, professor emeritus at the University of Colombo and former malaria expert at the World Health Organization
 Sachini Nipunsala, TV presenter, dancer 
 Sabeetha Perera, film actress
 Sumitra Peries, filmmaker and Sri Lanka's Ambassador to France
 Hirunika Premachandra, politician
 Jayathri Samarakone, Sri Lankan  High Commissioner to Singapore
 Inoka Sathyangani, film director and producer
 Ruchira Silva, fashion designer
 Deepali Wijesundera, Judge of the Court of Appeal of Sri Lanka

See also
 Education in Sri Lanka

References

External links
Visakha Vidyalaya

1917 establishments in Ceylon
Educational institutions established in 1917
National schools in Sri Lanka
Buddhist schools in Sri Lanka
Girls' schools in Sri Lanka
Schools in Colombo